Dough Boys is a 2009 drama film written and produced by Preston A. Whitmore II and directed by Nicholas Harvell.

Plot
1100 Jefferson Street is not just any address; it’s everything for 4 friends bonded by both their circumstances and their struggle to make something, anything out of their seemingly predetermined fate.

The crew played by Arlen Escarpeta, Cory Hardrict, Maurice McRae and Lorenzo Eduardo share one simple job description -- “Dough Boys”.

Corey, the all-around good guy with great potential (Escarpeta); Smooth, the ladies man, big dreamer and quintessential leader (Hardrict); Black, the eager-to-please skinny weed head (McRae) and Long Cuz, the skittishly annoying square trying to keep up with everyone else (Eduardo) form the group who make up their rules and moves as they go along.

Drama can always be found among 1100 Jefferson Street’s day-to-day dealings down to the resident crack head that serves as both lookout and snitch and the good-hearted Beauty (Reagan Gomez-Preston) running a full-service hair salon out of her one-bedroom apartment.

Meanwhile, Corey plays a balancing act with the streets and his future as he weighs the arguments of his girlfriend in one ear and mentor, Simuel – played by Gabriel Casseus – in the other to go back to school.

But constantly calling Corey’s attention are the “Dough Boys,” who dream big enough to spend their money before they get it and smoke their joints before they roll ‘em.

Although they shy clear of the drug game, the boys still do their streetwise duty in protecting the resident drug dealer in the building, played by Kirk Jones a.k.a. Sticky Fingaz. This is a loyal bond that pays off well. But their current “hustle” of choice is flipping counterfeit casino chips in a limited market.

The young men have obviously bit off more than they can chew and when their buyer Julian France, played by Wood Harris walks in it gets really interesting. Thus, the “Dough Boys” fight to stay alive as the rules of the street that they live by consequentially are the very rules that begin to pull them under.

Cast
 Amanda Aardsma as Palova
 Wood Harris as Julian
 Arlen Escarpeta as Corey
 Kirk Jones (Sticky Fingaz) as Deuce
 Reagan Gomez-Preston as Beauty
 Cory Hardrict as Smooth
 Maurice McRae as Black
 Lorenzo Eduardo as Long Cuz
 Page Kennedy as Aub
 Ricky Harris as Faze Disco
 Richard Brooks as Detective Nichols
 Cooper Harris as Detective Rice
 Gabriel Casseus as Simuel
 Kel Mitchell as Reggie
 Leonard A. Anderson as Officer White
 Mirtha Michelle as Selecia
 Tina Huang as Zena

Production

The film was produced and written by Preston A. Whitmore II. It is the first full-length feature film from director Nicholas Harvell and the inaugural feature from Whitmore’s “Give Back” program, where he funds independent films to give up and coming directors, actors and other filmmakers a shot at utilizing their skills. Bonnie Berry LaMon serves as executive producer.

Reception 
Black Film gave it a negative review, saying: "Dough Boys is a testosterone-fueled saga ostensibly designed to match the taste of fans of those musical glorification of misogyny, materialism and black-on-black crime popularized by the network."

See also 
 List of hood films

References

External links
 

2009 films
Hood films
2009 drama films
American drama films
2000s English-language films
2000s American films